Francis Patrick Keough (December 30, 1890 – December 8, 1961) was an American prelate of the Roman Catholic Church. He served as bishop of the Diocese of Providence in Rhode Island from 1934 to 1947 and as archbishop of the Archdiocese of Baltimore in Maryland from 1947 until his death in 1961.

Biography

Early life 
Francis Keough was born on June 10, 1916, in New Britain, Connecticut, the second and youngest son of Patrick and Margaret (née Ryan) Keough. His parents were Irish immigrants, and his father died when Francis was only five years old. He received his early education at the parochial school of St. Mary's Church in New Britain, and began his studies for the priesthood at St. Thomas Seminary in Bloomfield, Connecticut. In 1911, Keough was sent to the Grand Seminary of Saint-Sulpice in Issy-les-Moulineaux, France. He returned home following the outbreak of World War I, and completed his theological studies at St. Bernard's Seminary in Rochester, New York.

Priesthood 
On June 10, 1916, Keough was ordained a priest for the Diocese of Hartford by Bishop John Nilan. His first assignment was as a curate at St. Rose Parish in Meriden, Connecticut, where he remained until becoming private secretary to Bishop Nilan in 1919. He also served as diocesan director of the Society for the Propagation of the Faith, as assistant chancellor, and as chaplain of two institutions.

Bishop of Providence 
On February 10, 1934, Keough was appointed the fourth bishop of the Diocese of Providence by Pope Pius XI. He received his episcopal consecration on May 22, 1934, from Archbishop Amleto Cicognani, with Archbishop John Murray and Bishop James Cassidy serving as co-consecrators. 

During Keough's tenure in Providence, the Catholic population of the diocese increased from 325,000 to 425,000, and the number of clergy grew by fifty percent. He also founded a minor seminary, eased tensions between the French-speaking and English-speaking members of his congregation, and reduced the heavy financial debts burdening the diocese.

Archbishop of Baltimore 
On November 29, 1947, Keough was named by Pope Pius XII to succeed Michael Curley as the eleventh archbishop of the Archdiocese of Baltimore, . He was formally installed in the Basilica of the Assumption in Baltimore on February 24, 1948. During the fourteen years of his administration, the Catholic population of the archdiocese, the first Catholic see in the United States, grew from 265,000 to 400,000. The new Cathedral of Mary Our Queen in Baltimore and many new schools, homes, orphanages and other institutions were built. 

Keough was a trustee of the Catholic University of America in Washington, D.C. and a member of the American Board of Catholic Missions.  He served three terms as chair of the National Catholic Welfare Conference. Keough was known as the "Archbishop of the poor" due to his dedication to orphans and the aged. He was named an assistant to the papal throne in 1959.

Francis Keough died in Baltimore from a cerebral thrombosis on December 8, 1961 at age 70.

See also

 Catholic Church hierarchy
 Catholic Church in the United States
 Historical list of the Catholic bishops of the United States
 List of Catholic bishops of the United States
 Lists of patriarchs, archbishops, and bishops

References

External links
Official site of the Holy See

Episcopal succession

1890 births
1961 deaths
20th-century Roman Catholic archbishops in the United States
Roman Catholic archbishops of Baltimore
American Roman Catholic clergy of Irish descent
People from New Britain, Connecticut
Roman Catholic bishops of Providence
Neurological disease deaths in Maryland
Deaths from cerebral thrombosis
Catholic University of America trustees
Catholics from Connecticut
20th-century American academics